Biospeedotrema parajolliveti is a species of trematodes inhabiting hydrothermal vent fishes (particularly Thermichthys hollisi) in the south eastern Pacific Ocean. It can be distinguished from its family by its symmetrical testicular configuration; its uterus passing between the testes. Furthermore, it differs from Biospeedotrema jolliveti by being squat; wider than long; its tegument being wrinkled; its lobate testes, and the caeca "only just reach to the testes".

References

External links

Plagiorchiida
Parasitic helminths of fish
Animals described in 2014